The 39th Gawad Urian Awards or Ika-39 na Gawad Urian was held on June 22, 2016 at the Kia Theatre. They honored the best Filipino films for the year 2015. It was also aired live at Cinema One channel.

Nominations were announced on May 17. Da Dog Show, Honor Thy Father and Taklub received the most nominations with ten.

Taklub won Best Film, its only win in the night. Heneral Luna won most of the awards with four. The Natatanging Gawad Urian was given to Romy Vitug.

Winners and nominees

Multiple nominations and awards

References

External links
 Official Website of the Manunuri ng Pelikulang Pilipino

Gawad Urian Awards
2015 film awards
2016 in Philippine cinema